Pacific Hotel may refer to:

Pacific Hotel Shanghai, formerly the Hua Qiao Hotel
Pacific Hotel (Colorado), part of the Como Roundhouse, Railroad Depot and Hotel Complex
Pacific Hotel (Seattle), a 112 unit affordable housing apartment building in what was the Leamington Hotel & Apartments building designed by Julian F. Everett

See also
Grand Pacific Hotel (disambiguation)